Fashion Records is a UK-based record label, publishing reggae music.

Founded in summer 1980, Fashion Records is one of the more successful UK-based reggae labels, and one of only a few British reggae labels to release records that were produced in their own recording studio.

The label was the brainchild of John MacGillivray and Chris Lane, two reggae devotees, and was essentially a spin-off from MacGillivray's Dub Vendor record store. The first Fashion release hit number 1 in the UK reggae charts in the summer of 1980 - Dee Sharp's "Let's Dub It Up". In the next few years many British reggae artists, and artists who were passing through from Jamaica, turned up on the label: Keith Douglas, Carlton Manning (of Carlton & His Shoes), Alton Ellis, Carlton Lewis and Johnnie Clarke amongst others.

Studio opening
In 1982 Fashion opened a four-track studio, essentially an expansion of Lane’s dub-cutting facility, A-Class, in the basement of the new Dub Vendor shop in Clapham Junction. By this time the UK MC explosion had begun, and Fashion played a part with Papa Face, Laurel & Hardy, Pato Banton, Bionic Rhona, Macka B and Asher Senator. The dub-cutting service saw Paul Robinson (of One Blood) and Maxi Priest as regulars at the tiny subterranean studio and Robinson soon enjoyed hits with the label as Barry Boom, while Chris Lane played guitars and percussion with Maxi & Paul's 'Caution' band, contributing to (and engineering much of) Priest's debut album, You're Safe.

Smiley Culture had one of the biggest reggae hits of 1984 on Fashion with "Cockney Translation", and his single "Police Officer" went to number twelve in the UK Singles Chart, and he appeared on Top of the Pops. Their connection with the UK MC boom made the step into ragga and dance-hall in the mid-1980s a comparatively natural one, and the studio was busy enough to employ Gussie P, and later Frenchie as engineers – both went on to be producers with their own labels, Sip-A-Cup and Maximum Sound respectively.

Meanwhile, Fashion was also cutting lovers rock hits with Michael Gordon and Nerious Joseph, often coming out on another imprint, Fine Style. Two female acts were recruited, Winsome and Shako Lee (Janet Lee Davis). Winsome's "Am I The Same Girl", "Born Free" and "Super Woman" (with Tippa Irie) proved themselves classics of their type. Fashion also continued to work with a variety of  Jamaican acts, including Junior Delgado, Joseph Cotton ('No Touch The Style'), Leroy Gibbons, Frankie Paul, Glen Brown and Augustus Pablo.

New studio
In 1988, the label opened the new A-Class Studio, a sixteen-track set up in Forest Hill, South East London, and also began to lay tracks at Penthouse Studios in Jamaica, voicing and mixing them back in London. 1989/90 saw a string of reggae chart hits, with Janet Lee Davis' "Two Timing Lover" and Cutty Ranks' "The Stopper" both hitting number 1.  A second pop chart success, Louchie Lou & Michie One's  cover of the Isley Brothers', "Shout", licensed to London Records, and the rise of General Levy, also leased to London, helped to ensure that the label's reputation remained secure.

History

1990s
Throughout the 1990s, Fashion had frequent top placings in the UK reggae chart and a string of successful releases in Jamaica (and the US) with artists such as Peter Hunnigale, Sanchez, General Degree, Cutty Ranks and Janet Lee Davis. They also supplied the vocals to the UK garage hit "RipGroove" (Double 99 featuring Top Cat). The studio was also busy with production projects for other companies, and amongst other artists who recorded with Fashion were Michie One & Louchie Lou ("The Crickets Sing for Ana Maria"), Sayoko ("Sistren" with Michie One & Louchie Lou), and Phillip Leo ("Summer Girl" with Glamma Kid).

In early 1997, the A-Class Studio was again relocated and completely rebuilt, and the label was soon busy again working on new singles and albums with Janet Lee Davis, Starky Banton, Alton Ellis, The Dub Organiser, Neville Morrison, Ras Harry Chapman, Mykal Roze, and Sandeeno.

2000s
Since 2000, the label has been inactive and no new projects have been undertaken; however, there are plans for a re-release schedule which will make much of Fashion's back catalogue available again.

Digital relaunch
The first albums were released on the 19 March through Believe Digital. This included nine Fashion albums and a new compilation album Fashion in Finestyle – Significant Hits Volume One. The relaunch saw articles appearing in Dummy Mag, Echoes, The Wire and United Reggae. MacGillivray and Lane appeared on David Rodigan's radio show on Kiss FM to talk about the relaunch and to play some of their favourite Fashion tracks.

Remixes
"Inna Nice Up!"
In April 2012, an exclusive limited edition 12" from Nice Up! Records was released. The track listing included "Who's Gonna Make The Dance Ram" (Serial Killaz remix) and "Nice Up The Session" (Dub Pistols remix).

Labels
Various labels were owned by Fashion Records:
Fine Style
Top Notch
Arthur Daley International
Rubble Music
Hi-Fashion
Dub Organiser

Sources
The Guinness Who's Who of Reggae Page 93
The Rough Guide to Reggae Page 348

References

External links
Official website

British record labels
Reggae record labels